Birmingham Township, Pennsylvania could refer to:

 Birmingham Township, Chester County, Pennsylvania
 Birmingham Township, Delaware County, Pennsylvania (renamed to Chadds Ford Township in 1996)
 Birmingham Township, Schuyler County, Illinois